Virginia City Church is a historic church located near St. Paul, Wise County, Virginia. It was built about 1895, and is a small, one-room frame vernacular church. It has a front gable roof and is covered with weatherboard. The rectangular building measures 20 feet by 32 feet.  It was built by Virginia City coal camp residents on land donated by the Russell Creek Coal Company. The building also served the community as its first schoolhouse.

It was listed on the National Register of Historic Places in 2005.

References

Churches in Virginia
Churches in Wise County, Virginia
Churches on the National Register of Historic Places in Virginia
Churches completed in 1895
19th-century churches in the United States
National Register of Historic Places in Wise County, Virginia
1895 establishments in Virginia